Antonis Georgiou (born 1969) is a Cypriot lawyer and writer. He was born in Limassol and studied law in Moscow. A practicing lawyer, he also helps edit the Cypriot literary magazine Anef, and the Cypriot Theatre Diaries. Georgiou writes in multiple genres - poetry, short stories, plays, novels. His plays have been performed in his home country. His novel An Album of Stories was awarded the Cyprus State Prize and the EU Prize for Literature.

Selected works 
 Πανσέληνος παρά μία (Full Moon Minus One), poetry
 Γλυκιά bloody life (Sweet Bloody Life), short stories
 My Beloved Washing Machine, play, winner of the Theatre Prize of the Cyprus Theatre Organization) 
 The Disease, play, 2009
 Our Garden, play, 2011
 La Belote, play, 2014 
 I Was Lysistrata, play, 2016
 An Album of Stories, novel, 2014, winner of the Cyprus State Prize and the EU Prize for Literature

References

Cypriot writers
1969 births
Living people